Zlatoust is a city in Chelyabinsk Oblast, Russia, located on the Ay River (in the Kama basin),  west of Chelyabinsk. Population:    181,000 (1971); 161,000 (1959); 99,000 (1939); 48,000 (1926); 21,000 (1910).

Etymology
Apparently, the city's name is derived from the Russian translation of "Chrysostom", literally "golden-mouthed" in the original Greek, for the eloquent Saint John Chrysostom, because the city was founded near a church dedicated to that saint. In other languages the city is sometimes called Ызлататыс (Izlataltıs) or Зылатаус (Zılataus) in Tatar and Залатауыс in Bashkir.

History

Zlatoust was founded in 1754 due to the construction of the ironworks. In 1774–76, the workers of the plant took part in the insurrection led by Yemelyan Pugachev. In the early 19th century, Pavel Anosov made the first Russian bulat steel blades in Zlatoust. It was granted town status in 1865. From 1865 to 1919 Zlatoust was part of Ufa Governorate. The town is also known for the first cannons made of Russian steel. In 1903, the Tsarist authorities brutally suppressed a strike, organized by the workers of Zlatoust.

In 1815, an arms factory was built here, which began to produce sabres and swords. To establish production, more than a hundred experts were invited from renowned arms centers in Europe, including Solingen and Klingenthal (Germany).  In summer 1816, the first batch of Zlatoust blades was sent to Saint-Petersburg, both combat weapons and decorated samples. Famous artists Ivan Bushuyev and Ivan Boyarshinov authored unique patterns of cold-steel decorated with engravings. Bushuyev's and Boyarshinov's swords are very rare; under 2 dozen are believed to exist today, all in Russian state museums and wealthy Russians' collections (rare published example). The flying winged horse was a favorite element of many of Bushuyev's engravings, so he was given a nickname Ivan the Wingy (Ivanko Krylatko). Since then, a pegasus has been an emblem of the town. In the 1840s the engraving was shifted onto decorative metal plates. This idea was suggested by Zlatoust factory's director - Pavel Petrovich Anosov, who was taking care of facory's profit and decided to expand the product range. Since then Zlatoust engraving on household items and tableware became popular. The Soviets gained control over Zlatoust in March 1918. The town was occupied by the Whites between June 1918 and July 1919. On 13 July 1919, Zlatoust was seized by the Red Army.

During the Soviet period, Zlatoust became an industrial city, which specialized in metallurgy, mechanical engineering, tool-making, food production, and other industries. Zlatoust is one of the centers of artistic engraving on metal in Russia. Traditionally, such engravings were done on weapons, such as knives, swords and tableware. Zlatoust engraving on metal received an impulse to a new development, when in the 1960-s young graduates of art Zlatoust schools started to work at the factory and reveal their talents.

2013 meteor event

Administrative and municipal status
Within the framework of administrative divisions, it is, together with nine rural localities, incorporated as the City of Zlatoust—an administrative unit with the status equal to that of the districts. As a municipal division, the City of Zlatoust is incorporated as Zlatoustovsky Urban Okrug.

Climate

Notable natives or residents

 Boris Shaposhnikov, Marshal of the Soviet Union
 Lidiya Skoblikova,  Olympic and World Championship winning speed-skater 
 Anatoly Karpov, former world chess champion 
 Svetlana Ishmouratova, 2006 Olympic Gold Medalist biathlete
 Alexander Mordukhovich, composer
Yuri Mikhailovich Vyshinsky, filmmaker and screenwriter
Alyona Shvets, pop singer

References

Notes

Sources

External links

Official website of Zlatoust 
Zlatoust Business Directory  
Sights of Zlatoust
Zlatoust Knives, Gifts and Exclusive Souvenirs

 
Cities and towns in Chelyabinsk Oblast
Zlatoustovsky Uyezd
Populated places established in 1754
1754 establishments in the Russian Empire